Fort du fou is a 1963 Italian/French international co-production war film set during the First Indochina War co-written and directed by Leo Joannon. American International Pictures released the film straight to American television in 1965 under the title Outpost in Indochina.

Cast

Jacques Harden   ... Capitaine Noyelles 
Alain Saury   ...  Lieutenant Veyrac 
Jean Rochefort   ... Sergent Hérange 
 Foun-Sen   ...  Xuan 
 Jean-Loup Reynold   ... Private Bernard Jules 
 Mai-Trung   ...  The Priest 
 Van Quynh   ...  Chief of the Viet Minh
 Stan Dylik   ...  Chief Adjutant Prétot 
 Laurent Dumm   ... Sergent Durrieu 
 Le Bâ Dat   ...  Sergent Minh 
 Paul Luu Dinh   ...  Lu Banh 
 Nguyen Thi Tuyet   ... Marie Phuong 
 Michel Charrel   ... Private Vincent
 Robert Maurice   ... Private Masson 
 François Brincourt   ... Private Isnard

References

External links

1963 films
1963 war films
1960s French-language films
French war films
First Indochina War films
French black-and-white films
Siege films
1960s French films